Cinema is the fifteenth studio album by Italian classical tenor recording artist Andrea Bocelli. The album, featuring renditions of classic film soundtracks and scores, was released on 23 October 2015 through Sugar Music and Universal Music Group. A Spanish-language version of the album was also released and has been nominated Album of the Year at the 17th Annual Latin Grammy Awards. Cinema received a nomination for Best Traditional Pop Vocal Album at the 59th Annual Grammy Awards held in February 2017.

Background
The album was produced by David Foster, Humberto Gatica, and Tony Renis who also worked together on Bocelli's Amore in 2006.

Bocelli said of Cinema: "With the album Cinema, I'm fulfilling a wish that I've harboured for decades. I've never made a secret of my dream of bringing to life a recording project associated with soundtracks, as I truly believe that it's an exceptional artistic treasure trove."

Commercial performance
Cinema entered the Official UK Albums Chart at No. 3, behind 5 Seconds of Summer's Sounds Good Feels Good and Bryan Adams's Get Up!. The tally was Bocelli's highest UK chart position in over a decade, since 2001's Cieli di Toscana, and his tenth Top 10 album on the UK album chart, a record for a classical music artist.

The album also debuted at No. 10 on the Billboard 200, with 30,000 units sold, marking his eighth Top 10 effort. In addition, the album topped the Classical Crossover Albums chart, making Cinema Bocelli's 11th No. 1, and extending his record for the most chart-topping albums among all artists on that chart.

PBS special
Cinema was also made into a PBS special, filmed on 18 September 2015 at the Dolby Theatre in Los Angeles.

The program began airing on THIRTEEN's Great Performances series on 27 November 2015 on PBS stations nationwide, featuring Bocelli and Foster with additional guests including Nicole Scherzinger, as well as film stars John Travolta, Ali MacGraw, Ryan O'Neal and Andy García. The Blu-ray was released on 29 April 2016.

Singles
"E Più Ti Penso", a song written by Italian composer Ennio Morricone from the film Once Upon a Time in America, was re-recorded as a duet between Bocelli and American singer Ariana Grande. The song debuted at No. 1 on the Billboard Classical Digital Songs chart. A music video for the song was released on 13 October 2015.

Track listing

Charts

Weekly charts

Year-end charts

Certifications and sales

References

External links
Cinema andreabocelli.com
Andrea Bocelli: Cinema - About the Concert

Andrea Bocelli albums
Verve Records albums
Decca Records albums
Albums produced by David Foster
2015 albums
French-language albums
Italian-language albums
Spanish-language albums
Covers albums